Blenheim was launched in 1790 as West Indiaman, and spent almost all of her career as a West Indiaman. In 1818 she made one voyage to Bengal under a license from the British East India Company (EIC). On her return from Bengal she reverted to the West Indies trade. Later she traded between London and Quebec. She was wrecked in November 1836 and refloated. She was last listed in 1837.

Career
Blenheim entered Lloyd's Register (LR) in 1790 with G.Kitton, master, Fryer & Co., owner, and trade London–Jamaica.

In 1813 the EIC had lost its monopoly on the trade between India and Britain. British ships were then free to sail to India under a license from the EIC.

Blenheim appeared on a list of licensed ships sailing to India in 1818. Blenheim, Shirley, master, sailed for Calcutta on 17 October. 

 
In 1836 Blenheims  registry changed to Whitby. At that time her owners were James Terry, Francis Wilson, Henry Prescott, and Will Clarkson.

Fate
Blenheim, Wilson, master, was wrecked on 29 November 1846, on the Abo Tiller Bank, in the Baltic Sea off Nakskov, Denmark. Her crew were rescued. She was on a voyage from Saint Petersburg, Russia to London. Blenheim was refloated on 22 December and towed into Alboe, Sweden.

Blenheim was last listed in 1837 with Wilson, master, J. Terry, owner, and trade London–Quebec.

Citations

References
 
  

1790 ships
Age of Sail merchant ships of England